The Pro is a 2015 South African film directed by Andre Velts for kykNet. It is the first Afrikaans Surf Film to be produced. The film is based on Leon de Villiers book, also titled Die Pro. It was among the most anticipated Afrikaans Films at the Silwerskerm Film Festival alongside films such as Dis ek, Anna.

Plot
Teenage surfer, Matthew Le Roux, has to come to terms with the accidental death of his best friend, Aj Meyer.  After Aj’s death, Matthew doesn’t want to surf anymore. Then, Aj’s twin sister, Demi Meyer, returns to town and wants to be selected as a Wave-Seeker, a fictional World Surf Tour and something that Matthew and Aj wanted to be a part of. For Demi to succeed, she needs Matthew’s  help, and needs him to get back on his surfboard...

Cast 

Edwin van der Walt as Tiaan Nothnagel
Viljé Maritz as Dirkie Lawrence
Reine Swart as Yvette Lawrence
Albert Maritz as Kruiwa
Neels van Jaarsveld as Geyer
Arno Greeff as Dustin
Bennie Fourie as Hermann
Zakeeya Patel as Jasmine
Morné du Toit as Peet
Marcel_van_Heerden as Ed Nothnagel
Helene Truter as Elize Nothnagel
Dorette Potgieter as Mrs Lawrence
Simeon Scholtz as Young Dirkie

History

The film is based on the youth book by Leon de Villers. Leon de Villiers was born in Pretoria, 25 July 1960. He matriculated at Hercules High School in Pretoria. He then studied at the University of Pretoria, where he obtained a BA and Honors degree in Political Science and International Politics. He also obtained a Higher Education Diploma at the same university. After his studies he was a history teacher, but in 1993 he started writing full-time. His first youth book, Aliens and Angels, appeared in Tafelberg in 1996. His second book, Die Pro (1997), received a Sanlam Prize, the Scheepers Prize for Youth Literature and the M.E.R. Award. The book is a prescribed book for grade nine and ten students in South African schools.

References

External links
 

2015 films
Afrikaans-language films
Films shot in the Eastern Cape
South African drama films
Surfing films